The Men's Pan American Junior Championship is a men's international under-21 field hockey tournament organized by the Pan American Hockey Federation. The tournament has been held since 1978 and serves as a qualification tournament for the Junior World Cup.

Argentina has won every single tournament until 2021, when Chile became the first other nation to win the tournament.

Results

Successful national teams

* = host nation

Team appearances

See also
 Men's Pan American Cup
 Women's Pan American Junior Championship

References

External links
Pan American Hockey Federation

 
Junior
Recurring sporting events established in 1978
Pan American Junior Championship